MagicBands and MagicBands 2 are plastic bracelets that contain RFID radios, used at Walt Disney World Resort. The MagicBands form the central part of the MyMagic+ experience, providing a way for the system to connect data to guests. This includes connecting park tickets, hotel room keys, payments, and PhotoPass information to the MagicBands. The bands were announced on January 7, 2013, by Tom Staggs as a part of MyMagic+.

Development

MagicBands were developed alongside the MyMagic+ program as a way to tie all of the different elements of the program together. The MagicBand idea came at the start of the Next Generation Experience (the code name for what became MyMagic+), when one of the original five members of the project, business development VP John Padgett, was on a flight between Burbank, the Walt Disney Company's headquarters, and Orlando, the location of Walt Disney World. Padgett saw a magnetic therapy, a pseudoscientific alternative medicine practice,  wristband in a SkyMall magazine, which claimed to ease sore muscles "while simultaneously improving one's golf swing". He and the project team began considering the design of a wristband encoded with "everything a guest might need—park tickets, photos, coupons, even money". Soon afterward, they created a makeshift xBand (the original code name for the MagicBand) using a velcro strip, a plastic liner, and an RFID tag.

The original MagicBand design was created by Frog Design. The original design consisted of an outer plastic grey bracelet, which can be removed to adjust for a smaller sized wrist, and an inner plastic bracelet. The inner plastic bracelet is one of eight base colors, which can then have a series of different designs printed on them for an extra fee. Sealed inside of the middle of the inner band is the circuitry, consisting of high frequency and ultra-high frequency antennas and a coin cell battery, all embedded on a PCB. Directly outside of the circuitry is an outline of Mickey Mouse's head on the front, while the back includes the Band ID, the FCC ID number, and other information.

On November 19, 2016, a new MagicBand design, MagicBand 2, was announced. The new design increases the size of the Mickey head and the circuitry area. This part, called the Icon, is able to be removed from the rest of the wristband with a special screwdriver and placed in other bands or special accessories such as a key-chain.

Disney has announced a new band called MagicBand+. MagicBand is available at Disneyland starting October 26, 2022. The wearable device will allow parkgoers to play exclusive games in parks and gives guests a hands-free way to enter the park. Magicband+ is also waterproof and rechargeable. A new interactive game in Galaxy’s Edge will also launch with MagicBand+. When wearing the band, guests can participate in the interactive quest to collect bounties throughout the land.

Implementation
Until January 1, 2021, MagicBands were free to all Disney Resort guests. Until August 16, 2021, the bands were free to annual passholders. While other guests receive an RFID-enabled Key to the World card, they are able to purchase a MagicBand online or at the parks. In March of the same year, Disney launched the MagicMobile Pass on Apple Wallet for iOS and watchOS devices. The pass allows guests to access the parks by tapping their devices to special NFC touchpoints throughout the resort. The service was later extended to Google Wallet on Android devices in April.

Touchpoints, consisting of a ring with an outline of Mickey Mouse's head, are located at park entry points, Fastpass+ entry points, PhotoPass locations, and point of sales location. When a guest walks up to one, they place their MagicBand's circuitry location against the center of the ring (known as putting "Mickey to Mickey"), in order to engage the system. The ring and outline on the touchpoint will then light up green if access is granted, while it will turn blue if cast member assistance is required. Some special edition MagicBands with graphics printed on them will cause the touchpoints to light up different colors and make different noises instead of the default green, when access is granted. An example of this is the red lightsaber Star Wars themed MagicBand, which changed the default green to red. In normal settings, the touchpoints will never turn red, due to the negative connotation of the color.

Handheld MagicBand readers are used at sit-down restaurants for point of sales and by PhotoPass photographers to link photos. These handheld readers do not have the light up features of the touchpoints.

The MagicBands are also used to connect guests' on-ride photos to their PhotoPass using the long-range ultra-high frequency radio without guests having to use touchpoints to associate the pictures to their account. The MagicBands also allow guests to interact, using a system called Storymaker, with screens in rides or queues, such as It's a Small World, Rock 'n' Roller Coaster starring Aerosmith, Haunted Mansion, and Expedition Everest.

On February 13, 2017, it was announced that over 29 million MagicBands had been made.

The MagicBand system has also been used to enforce COVID-19 safety protocols inside the NBA Bubble for the resumption of the 2019-20 NBA season at the ESPN Wide World of Sports Complex; access to courts and practice facilities requires scanning a MagicBand in order to verify that the wearer has completed mandatory health monitoring protocols.

References

External links

Unofficial List of all released MagicBand Designs
MagicBands on Disney Store website

Bracelets
Disney technology
Products introduced in 2013
Walt Disney Parks and Resorts